Hexagonia may refer to:
 Hexagonia (beetle), a genus of beetles in the family Carabidae
 Hexagonia (fungus), a genus of fungi in the family Polyporaceae
 Hexagonia (chess variant), published in 1864

See also 
 Hexagonaria, a genus of colonial rugose coral